Primera Fila (English: Front row/First row) is a Sony Music album series and it may refer to:

Primera Fila (Vicente Fernández album), 2008
Primera Fila (Thalía album), 2009
Primera Fila, a 2010 album by Mexican group OV7
Primera Fila, a 2011 album by Argentinean singer-songwriter Miguel Mateos
En Primera Fila, a 2011 album by Venezuelan singer-songwriter Franco De Vita
Vuelve en Primera Fila, a 2013 album by De Vita
Primera Fila, a 2012 by Italian singer Gigi D'Alessio
Primera Fila: Sasha Benny Erik, a 2012 album by Mexican singers Sasha Sokol, Benny Ibarra and Erik Rubin
Primera Fila (Fey album), 2012
Primera Fila, a 2013 album by Spanish band La Oreja de Van Gogh
En Primera Fila: Día 1, a 2013 album by Mexican singer Cristian Castro
Primera Fila: Dia 2, a 2014 album by Castro
La Guzmán: Primera Fila, a 2013 album by Mexican singer Alejandra Guzmán
Primera Fila Flans, a 2014 album by Ivonne, Ilse, and Mimí, a Mexican group formerly known as Flans
Primera Fila: Hecho Realidad, a 2014 album by American duo Ha*Ash
Primera Fila, a 2015 album by Las Tres Grandes (composed of Guadalupe Pineda, Tania Libertad and Eugenia León)
Roberto Carlos – Primera Fila, a 2015 album by Brazilian singer Roberto Carlos
Primera Fila, a 2017 album by Mexican band Bronco
Primera fila: Una Última Vez (Encore), a 2017 album by Mexican band Sin Bandera
Primera Fila, a 2017 album by Mexican singer Yuri
Primera Fila: Desierto, a 2017 album by Mexican singer Yuridia

Primera Fila may also refer to:

Television
Primera Fila, a Spanish television program broadcast by TVE, which ran from 1962-1965